Suhas Gopinath (born 4 November 1986 in Bangalore) is an Indian entrepreneur. He is the founder, CEO, and Chairman of Globals Inc., a multinational IT company. He took charge as CEO at the age of 17, three years after founding the company.

Early life
Gopinath was born in Bangalore in the Indian state of Karnataka to his father, a defense scientist, and mother, a housewife. He taught himself to make websites with the help of books, and made his first, www.coolhindustan.com, at the age of 14. He incorporated his company Globals Inc., the same year, in 2000. He became CEO of his company at the age of 17. He was thought to be, for a time, the youngest CEO of a company.

Recognition
 In 2005, Gopinath was the youngest among the 175 recipients of Karnataka's Rajyotsava Award.
 On 2 December 2007, The European Parliament and International Association for Human Values conferred "Young Achiever Award" on Gopinath at the European Parliament, Brussels.
 In November 2008, he was invited to represent the World Bank's ICT Leadership Roundtable for adopting ICT in Africa to increase employability and fostering ICT skills in students from these countries.
 He was announced as "Young Global Leader" for 2008–2009 by the World Economic Forum, Davos. In that position he would be involved in development programs across the world. He holds a diploma on global leadership and public policy from the John F. Kennedy School of Government and Harvard University.

References

External links
Meet the world's youngest CEO - Rediff Business, 12 October 2010

Indian chief executives
Businesspeople from Bangalore
1986 births
Living people
Harvard Kennedy School alumni
Indian expatriates in the United States
21st-century Indian businesspeople
Recipients of the Rajyotsava Award 2005